In 1993 the British Lions rugby union team toured New Zealand. This was the last Lions tour in the sport's amateur era. The Lions were managed by Geoff Cooke, coached by Ian McGeechan and Dick Best, and captained by Gavin Hastings.

The Lions played a three-test series against New Zealand, and ten matches against provincial teams and the New Zealand Maori. They won six and lost four of those games. The Lions lost the first test match, but won the second to level the series, with New Zealand winning the third test and the series.

Squad

Backs

Forwards

Schedule

Test series

First test
The first test was won by New Zealand.

Second test
The Lions won the second Test, with a particularly strong performance by Ben Clarke.

Third test
Thus the series came down to the third Test decider at Eden Park. The Lions took a 10–0 lead, but New Zealand, helped by strong local support, recovered to easily win 30–13.

References

External links
 http://www.bbc.co.uk/wales/scrumv/features/lions/1993.shtml
 http://www.sportnetwork.net/main/s446/st77474.htm
 Squad from Lions Official website
 Matches from Lions Official website

1993
1993 rugby union tours
1992–93 in Irish rugby union
1993 in New Zealand rugby union
1992–93 in British rugby union